Leedes is a surname. Notable people with the surname include:

 John Leedes (died 1656), English landowner and politician 
 Thomas Leedes (died 1645), English politician

See also
 Leeds (surname)